Teeters Nunatak is a nunatak (615 m) standing 5 nautical miles (9 km) north of Hodgson Nunatak in the Hudson Mountains, Antarctica.

It was mapped by United States Geological Survey (USGS) from surveys and U.S. Navy air photos, 1960–66. It was named by Advisory Committee on Antarctic Names (US-ACAN) for Robert E. Teeters, U.S. Navy, storekeeper at Byrd Station, 1966.

Hudson Mountains
Nunataks of Ellsworth Land
Volcanoes of Ellsworth Land
Miocene stratovolcanoes